Frank Lewis O'Bannon (January 30, 1930 – September 13, 2003) was an American politician who served as the 47th governor of Indiana from 1997 until his death in 2003. As of January 2023, he remains the most recent United States Governor to have died in office.

O'Bannon was a native of Corydon, Indiana. He graduated from Corydon High School (now Corydon Central High School) in 1948 and then Indiana University, where he met his wife Judy. In Corydon, he served as a practicing attorney and a newspaper publisher for The Corydon Democrat before his entrance into the political arena.

A conservative Democrat, O'Bannon was first elected to the Indiana Senate in 1969. He eventually became one of the body's most prominent members. O'Bannon ran for Governor of Indiana in 1988; however, instead of facing a hotly competitive primary, O'Bannon dropped out of the race and became the running mate of Evan Bayh. The Bayh/O'Bannon ticket was successful, and O'Bannon served in the role of lieutenant governor for eight years. In this position, he served as President of the State Senate and directed the state's agriculture and commerce programs.

With Bayh ineligible to seek a third consecutive term as governor in 1996, O'Bannon ran for governor that year. He was initially considered a heavy underdog but emerged a narrow victor over Indianapolis Mayor Stephen Goldsmith. He was re-elected in 2000, defeating Congressman David M. McIntosh. As governor, O'Bannon was known for advocating for education-related issues and helping to create the state's AMBER Alert System. He presided over a period of economic prosperity for the state in the 1990s and served a term as Chairman of Midwestern Governors Association. O'Bannon died in office in 2003 and was succeeded by Lieutenant Governor Joe E. Kernan. He is the most recent governor of any U.S. state to die in office.  As of 2022, he is also the most recent Democrat to be elected governor of Indiana.

Background
O'Bannon was a native of Corydon, Indiana (the first state capital of Indiana), where his family owned the Corydon Democrat, the town's newspaper. His father, Robert Presley O'Bannon, served in the Indiana House of Representatives and later served in the Indiana Senate. His mother was the former Faith Dropsey. Frank was also the great-grandson of Presley Neville O'Bannon, a First Lieutenant in the United States Marine Corps who was the first to raise the US flag on foreign soil in a time of war, on April 27, 1805, during the Tripoli Campaign in the First Barbary War. He attended Indiana University, where he played one season of basketball for the Hoosiers.  At IU, he was president of the Zeta Chapter of the Phi Gamma Delta fraternity. He earned a B.A. in government in 1952, and a J.D. in 1957 from the Indiana University School of Law – Bloomington.

He also spent two years in the United States Air Force. While at IU, he met his wife, Judith Asmus, on a blind date and they married in 1957. Following law school, he opened a law office in Corydon, was chairman of the board of the family newspaper publishing firm (a position he held until the time of his death), and was a member of the board of the Corydon Savings and Loan.

Political career

Indiana Senate
First elected to the state senate in 1969-70 to a seat occupied by his father, Robert P. O'Bannon, from 1950 to 1970, Frank O'Bannon was the primary sponsor of legislation reintroducing the death penalty. He rose to the rank of Senate Minority Leader among Democrats during his tenure in the legislative body. He served one two-year stint as chair of the Senate Finance Committee following a short-lived Democratic majority.

Lieutenant Governor of Indiana
O'Bannon launched his first campaign for governor in May 1987 from Corydon, Indiana and initially faced off against then-Secretary of State Evan Bayh and Kokomo Mayor Steve Daily. O'Bannon abandoned his own bid for governor in January 1988 and joined forces with Bayh and won election as the 46th Lieutenant Governor of Indiana in November 1988. His candidacy for lieutenant governor matched that of his grandfather, Lew M. O'Bannon, who was the 1924 Democratic nominee for the state's second-highest office. As lieutenant governor, he presided as President of the State Senate, served as the state's Director of Commerce and Commissioner of Agriculture.

Governor of Indiana
In 1996, with Evan Bayh ineligible to seek a third consecutive term as governor due to term limits, O'Bannon became the Democratic nominee for governor. He overcame an early deficit in the polls against his Republican opponent, Indianapolis mayor Stephen Goldsmith and won in a close race, 52% to 47%. He was re-elected by a larger margin, 57% to 42%, in 2000 against second district Congressman David M. McIntosh.

During the boom years of the 1990s, when Indiana amassed a record $2 billion surplus, O'Bannon was able to cut taxes by $1.5 billion, hire 500 more police officers in the state and win increased funding for schools and extended health insurance for poor families. He also signed landmark legislation creating the AMBER Alert program in Indiana, as well as legislation requiring drivers to slow or change lanes for emergency vehicles stopped along Hoosier roadways.

In the years of 1998 and 1999 O'Bannon served as the Chairman of Midwestern Governors Association.  In 1999, O'Bannon created the Public Access Counselor Office by executive order after a statewide collaboration of seven newspapers found great obstacles in obtaining government information in Indiana.  In 1999, the Indiana General Assembly established it by statute.

In 2000 he won an easy re-election bid under the theme of Keeping Indiana Moving in the Right Direction. His campaign featured memorable advertisements with O'Bannon reprising his basketball past by shooting a perfect jump shot.

After the 9/11 disaster and subsequent market downturn, Indiana lost 120,000 jobs, tax revenues dropped, and O'Bannon had to cut social services and other services in order to spare education. In 2001 he worked with the state legislature to formulate a major restructuring of the state tax system. His opponents blamed him for various problems arising in the second term, including a slow response by his environmental agency to a big fish kill, and problems at two-state centers for the developmentally disabled.

His record, however, was firmly established as an educational leader for the state. He helped lead development of Indiana's first community college system, pushed for early-childhood learning opportunities, development of alternative high schools, and charter schools. His work as chair of the state's landmark Education Roundtable ensured that Indiana was one of only five states whose schools immediately qualified as meeting all standards set by the federal No Child Left Behind act upon enactment. In regards to education, O’Bannon placed emphasis on enhancing the state's public schools. He was able to pass increased funding for education . However, the state legislature did not pass O'Bannon's proposal for full-day kindergarten.

O'Bannon attempted to install a stone monument featuring the Ten Commandments on the state capitol grounds. However, the courts blocked this effort.

Death and legacy

O'Bannon suffered a massive stroke on September 8, 2003, while he was in Chicago attending the U.S. Midwest–Japan trade conference. He was taken to Northwestern Memorial Hospital where he remained unconscious. O'Bannon's condition worsened; based on his living will, his family decided to use no further means of support and care. He died on September 13, 2003, aged 73, leaving behind his wife Judy (Asmus), three children (Polly, Jennifer and Jonathan) and five grandchildren. O'Bannon donated organs (having signed legislation making organ donation easier in Indiana), including his cornea which helped an Illinois woman regain her sight. O’Bannon’s ashes were scattered in the O'Bannon family plot at Cedar Hill Cemetery in his hometown of Corydon, Indiana.

O'Bannon was succeeded in office by Lieutenant Governor Joe E. Kernan of South Bend, who was sworn into office just hours after O'Bannon's death in an emotional ceremony.

O'Bannon is the subject of the 2006 biography Legacy of a Governor: The Life of Indiana's Frank O'Bannon.

In February 2006, a memorial bust of O'Bannon was placed outside the Indiana Statehouse Senate chambers.

Judy O'Bannon resided in her husband's hometown of Corydon, Indiana, and remained active in Democratic politics and in her husband's newspaper, The Corydon Democrat. She hosted a statewide public television program, Communities Building Community. In November 2013, she married Donald Willsey.

See also

List of governors of Indiana

References

External links
O'Bannon Institute for Community Service - Ivy Tech Community College
Frank O'Bannon profile from the State of Indiana
Indianapolis Star biography of O'Bannon
 

|-

|-

|-

|-

|-

|-

1930 births
2003 deaths
20th-century American politicians
21st-century American politicians
American United Methodists
American people of Irish descent
Democratic Party governors of Indiana
Indiana University Maurer School of Law alumni
Lieutenant Governors of Indiana
Organ transplant donors
People from Corydon, Indiana
Military personnel from Indiana
Editors of Indiana newspapers
Indiana lawyers
20th-century American lawyers
20th-century Methodists